Shore Road Goods was a goods terminus in Birkenhead, England. The goods station was situated near to Morpeth Dock, on the Birkenhead Dock Branch railway line, and operated by the Cheshire Lines Committee. The CLC was granted permission to run two locomotives on the dock lines from 13 March 1884. The engine shed, which adjoined the goods station, was opened in 1888 and closed in 1961. The main building of the goods station is still in existence, and is used as an office for Wirral Metropolitan Borough Council's archives service.

References

Sources
 
 

Disused railway goods stations in Great Britain